The 1999 Nigerian Senate elections in Ebonyi State was held on February 20, 1999, to elect members of the Nigerian Senate to represent Ebonyi State. Sylvanus Ngele representing Ebonyi North, Obasi Osulor representing Ebonyi Central and Anyim Pius Anyim representing Ebonyi South all won on the platform of the Peoples Democratic Party.

Overview

Summary

Results

Ebonyi North 
The election was won by Sylvanus Ngele of the Peoples Democratic Party.

Ebonyi Central 
The election was won by Obasi Osulor of the Peoples Democratic Party.

Ebonyi South 
The election was won by Anyim Pius Anyim of the Peoples Democratic Party.

References 

Ebo
Ebo
Ebonyi State Senate elections